Geneva Robertson-Dworet (born May 8, 1985) is an American screenwriter. She rose to prominence after being hired in 2015 to rewrite the script for the 2018 Tomb Raider reboot, starring Alicia Vikander and directed by Roar Uthaug. She co-wrote the screenplay for Marvel Studios' Captain Marvel (2019).

She will write the screenplay for David Ayer's Gotham City Sirens film, as part of the DC Extended Universe. She is also writing the upcoming third Sherlock Holmes, the newest adaptation of the role playing game Dungeons & Dragons, and the screenplay for Artemis.

She was originally slated to co-write Sony's Silver & Black, a team-up film about the Spider-Man characters Black Cat and Silver Sable, with Lindsey Beer. However the film was removed from Sony's production schedule and the project's future is unclear.

She is set to co-write Matt Shakman's Star Trek film, with Lindsey Beer, as well as set to co-showrun the Amazon Prime television adaptation of the Fallout video game franchise.

Robertson-Dworet is a 2007 graduate of Harvard College. She wrote for The Harvard Lampoon during her time there. She is married to writer Hayes Davenport.

Filmography

Film

Television

References

External links 
 

1985 births
The Harvard Lampoon alumni
Living people
American women screenwriters
21st-century American women